Eric A. Hessels is a Canadian physicist, currently a Canada Research Chair and Distinguished Research Professor at York University in Toronto, Ontario. In September 2019, Hessels et al. measured the Lamb shift for hydrogen to measure the radius of a proton and demonstrated that it is consistent with the value obtained for muonic hydrogen. This proved that the supposed discrepancy known as the proton radius puzzle did not exist.

References

Year of birth missing (living people)
Living people
Academic staff of York University
Canadian physicists
21st-century Canadian astronomers
University of Notre Dame alumni
Canada Research Chairs